Angela Wynter is a Jamaican-British actress. She is known for her role as Yolande Trueman in the BBC soap opera EastEnders, appearing from 2003 to 2008, with a guest appearance in 2017. In 2021, she joined the cast of the BBC soap opera Doctors as Makeda Sylvester.

Life and career
Wynter was born in Kingston, Jamaica. After emigrating to the United Kingdom, she moved to Hinckley, Leicestershire. In her first acting role, a stage play titled Meetings, she acted opposite her later on-screen EastEnders spouse Rudolph Walker. Wynter received acclaim for playing the role of Mout in the Talawa Theatre Company production of Sol B River's  monologue To Rahtid, directed by Yvonne Brewster at the Young Vic Studio in 1996.

In 2003, Wynter was cast in the BBC soap opera EastEnders as Yolande Trueman. She based the characterisation of Yolande on her dead sister Merlene. She left the role in 2008, later making a guest appearance in 2017. On 3 February 2019, Wynter appeared in the ITV drama Vera in the episode "The Seagull". In 2021, she joined the cast of the BBC soap opera Doctors as Makeda Sylvester.

References

External links
 

Black British actresses
British film actresses
British soap opera actresses
British television actresses
Jamaican expatriates in England
Jamaican film actresses
Jamaican soap opera actresses
Jamaican television actresses
Living people
Year of birth missing (living people)